Dario Palazzani (born 18 August 1954) is an Italian sports shooter. He competed at the 1988 Summer Olympics and the 1992 Summer Olympics.

References

1954 births
Living people
Italian male sport shooters
Olympic shooters of Italy
Shooters at the 1988 Summer Olympics
Shooters at the 1992 Summer Olympics
Sportspeople from Brescia
20th-century Italian people